Filip Tapalović (born 22 October 1976 in Gelsenkirchen, Germany) is a former Croatian international footballer and the current assistant manager for 2.Bundesliga club Hamburger SV.

Playing career

International
He made his debut for Croatia in a May 2002 friendly match away against Hungary and earned a total of 3 caps, scoring no goals. His final international was four months later, a European Championship qualification match against Estonia.

Managerial career
In 2013 he became youth team manager at TSV 1860 Munich. He left the club after two seasons.

On 26 June 2017, he became assistant manager at A-League club Adelaide United. Tapalović departed following Adelaide United's decision not to renew Marco Kurz' contract and followed Kurz to Melbourne Victory where he is currently the club's assistant manager.

Personal life
His brother Toni Tapalović is also a former footballer and was employed as a goalkeeper coach at FC Bayern Munich.

References

External links
 

1976 births
Living people
Sportspeople from Gelsenkirchen
Footballers from North Rhine-Westphalia
German people of Croatian descent
Association football midfielders
Croatian footballers
Croatia international footballers
VfL Bochum players
FC Schalke 04 players
TSV 1860 Munich players
FC Wacker Innsbruck (2002) players
FC Carl Zeiss Jena players
HNK Rijeka players
Bundesliga players
2. Bundesliga players
Austrian Football Bundesliga players
Croatian Football League players
Croatian expatriate footballers
Expatriate footballers in Austria
Croatian expatriate sportspeople in Austria
Hamburger SV non-playing staff
German expatriate footballers
German expatriate sportspeople in Austria
German footballers
German expatriate sportspeople in Australia
Croatian expatriate sportspeople in Australia